Winterhude is a quarter in the ward Hamburg-Nord of Hamburg, Germany. As of 2020 the population was 56,382.

History
Winterhude was first mentioned in the 13th century, but archeological findings of tools, weapons and grave-mounds were dated to 1700 BC and 700 BC.

During World War II the port of Hamburg and therefore Winterhude were targets of the air raids of the so-called Operation Gomorrah.

Geography
In 2006 according to the statistical office of Hamburg and Schleswig-Holstein, the Winterhude quarter has a total area of 7.6 km². To the north is the Alsterdorf quarter and the Barmbek-Nord quarter is in the east. In the west are the Eppendorf and the Harvestehude quarters and in the south are the Uhlenhorst and Barmbek-Süd quarters.

The City Park of Hamburg (Hamburger Stadtpark) is located within Winterhude.

Demographics
In 2007, the population of the Winterhude quarter was 48,799. In 1999, there were 31,732 households, and 60.4% of all households were made up of individuals. The average household size was 1.61.

Population by year

In 2007 there were 4,622 criminal offences (95/1000 people).

Education
In 2006 there were 6 elementary schools and 3 secondary schools in the Winterhude quarter with 3,959 pupils.

Infrastructure

Established in 1956, the Consulate-General of the Republic of Indonesia is located in the quarter. The Consulate-General of the Islamic Republic of Iran was established in 1858 and is also located in the street Bebelallee.

Health systems
The hospital Israelitisches Krankenhaus has 180 beds.

There were 32 day-care centers for children, 156 physicians in private practice and 16 pharmacies.

Transportation
Winterhude is serviced by the rapid transit system of the underground railway with several stations: Sierichstraße, Borgweg und Saarlandstraße (line U3), Hudtwalkerstraße and Lattenkamp (line U1) . According to the Department of Motor Vehicles (Kraftfahrt-Bundesamt), in the quarter Winterhude were 15,992 private cars registered (328 cars/1000 people).

Notes

References

 Statistical office Hamburg and Schleswig-Holstein Statistisches Amt für Hamburg und Schleswig-Holstein, official website 
  List of the Consular corps, the trade missions, cultural institutes and international institutes in the Free and Hanseatic city of Hamburg:

External links

Quarters of Hamburg
Hamburg-Nord